Zoya Hasan is an Indian academic and political scientist.

Education and career 
She was Professor of Political Science and Dean of the School of Social Sciences (SSS) at the Jawaharlal Nehru University, New Delhi. She served as a member of the National Commission for Minorities from 2006 to 2009. She has been a Visiting Professor to the Universities of Zurich, Edinburgh, and Maison des Sciences de L'Homme, Paris, and held fellowships at the Institute of Development Studies, University of Sussex, Rockefeller Centre, Bellagio, and Centre for Modern Oriental Studies, Berlin. She has worked on research projects for the Indian Council of Social Science Research, Ford Foundation, DFID, United Nations Research Institute for Social Development and the Observer Research Foundation.

Hasan's work has focussed on state, political parties, ethnicity, gender and minorities in India, and society in north India. She is better known for her path-breaking work on the politics of Uttar Pradesh.

She has also done extensive research on social and educational aspects of Indian Muslims and Muslim women.

Personal life
Zoya Hasan was married to the Indian historian and former Vice Chancellor of Jamia Millia Islamia University, New Delhi, Mushirul Hasan (1949-2018).

References

Living people
21st-century Indian Muslims
Indian women political writers
Academic staff of Jawaharlal Nehru University
Indian political writers
Scholars from Uttar Pradesh
Indian women educational theorists
20th-century Indian educational theorists
20th-century Indian women writers
20th-century Indian non-fiction writers
21st-century Indian women writers
21st-century Indian non-fiction writers
21st-century Indian educational theorists
English-language writers from India
Women writers from Uttar Pradesh
Women scientists from Uttar Pradesh
Indian women scholars
Year of birth missing (living people)
Women educators from Uttar Pradesh
Educators from Uttar Pradesh
20th-century women educators
21st-century women educators
Centre for Political Studies (CPS), Jawaharlal Nehru University